Love Unto Death (original title: L'Amour à mort) is a 1984 French drama film directed by Alain Resnais.

Plot 
Elisabeth, a scientist, lives with Simon, an archaeologist. One night, Simon suffers a seizure and is declared dead by a doctor. After a grieving Elisabeth screams for him not to be dead, Simon unexpectedly comes back to life. Elisabeth and Simon discuss the experience with their friends, protestant pastors Judith and Jérôme. Simon seems at first to have resumed a normal life, but being "dead" for a short moment has left him tormented and bitter. He reveals to Elisabeth that he saw many people in the afterlife and expresses a desire to go back there, as he now feels out of place in the world. Elisabeth, who doubts that Simon actually died and does not believe in the afterlife, pleads for him to remain with her. Simon eventually has another seizure and dies for good. Elisabeth comes to believe that it is now her destiny to join him wherever he is. She discusses the philosophical implications with Jérôme and Judith. Jérôme tries to talk her out of it, and even raises the possibility that the afterlife may not exist ; Judith supports Elisabeth's decision, which she compares to Jesus marching to Jerusalem. As Elisabeth leaves, Judith consoles Jérôme.

Production

The film was shot in Uzès, Gard, in the south of France.

Cast
 Sabine Azéma - Elisabeth Sutter
 Fanny Ardant - Judith Martignac
 Pierre Arditi - Simon Roche
 André Dussollier - Jérôme Martignac
 Jean Dasté - Dr. Rozier
 Geneviève Mnich - Anne Jourdet
 Jean-Claude Weibel - Le spécialiste
 Louis Castel - Michel Garenne
 Françoise Rigal - Juliette Dotax
 Françoise Morhange - Mme Vigne
 Jean Champion - (voice)
 Yvette Etiévant - (voice)
 Bernard Malaterre - (voice)

External links

French drama films
1984 drama films
Films directed by Alain Resnais
Films about the afterlife
Resurrection in film
1980s French-language films
1980s French films